The Observatory of Turin (also known as Pino Torinese; obs. code: 022) is an astronomical observatory owned and operated by Italy's National Institute for Astrophysics (INAF). It is located on the top of a hill in the town of Pino Torinese near Turin, in the north Italian Piedmont region. The observatory was founded in 1759. At Pino Torinese, several asteroid discoveries were made by Italian astronomer Luigi Volta in the late 1920s and early 1930s. The asteroid 2694 Pino Torinese was named after the observatory's location.

Asteroids discovered at Pino Torinese

See also 
 List of astronomical observatories

References

External links 
  Osservatorio Astronomico di Torino

Torino
1759 establishments in Italy
Pino Torinese